Moya Strana, Moya Bălgaria (translated as "My Country, My Bulgaria") is a patriotic song by Bulgarian singer Emil Dimitrov, issued in 1970. The lyrics of the song were written by Vasil Andreev. It was chosen as "The Song of the Century" in Bulgaria and is considered as an unofficial (second) national anthem of Bulgaria.

Song lyrics

References

Bulgarian patriotic songs
1970 songs